The Australian Capital Territory Softball Association is a regional sports body in Australia. It was founded in 1959 as the Federal Districts Women's Softball Association, a group under the New South Wales Softball Association until it became an independent state body in 1961.

History 
https://www.act.softball.org.au/history/

Yearly events 
The ACT Softball Association holds a number of annual events;

Slow-Pitch invitational
This year(2006) will be the inaugural event.

Canberra Skins
An annual Men's tournament hosted by Softball Canberra in two grades, A Grade and B Grade, both play for prize money, for more information see main article.

Australia Day Carnival
An Annual Juniors event held over the Australia Day long weekend at the end of January.
The Carnival caters for both boys and girls in the following;
Under 12 Boys and Girls,
Under 14 Boys and Girls,
Under 16 Boys and Girls and
Under 19 Men's.
Other
Various ACT teams also compete in the New South Wales Softball Association's annual events;
State League, and
Warratah League.

State teams 
The ACT attends all ASF National Championships
Under 16 Boys - 1st in 2000, Placed 6th in 2006,
Under 16 Girls - Placed 4th in 2006,
Under 19 Men - 1st in 2001, 2002, 2003, 2004, Placed 2nd in 2006,
Under 19 Women - Placed 5th in 2006,
Under 23 Men - 2006 Series yet to be played,
Under 23 Women - 2006 Series yet to be played,
Open Men - 1st in 2006, 2007, 2008, 2009
Open Women - Places 4th in 2006.

In recent times ACT softball has become the powerhouse of Men's softball in Australia and also produced some of the best male softballers in the world.

In 2000 the ACT under 16 Boys' team claimed their first National Title in Canberra, ACT. This team saw the birth of some future Australian and World softball stars. This team saw the start of outstanding careers of Andrew Kirkpatrick, Nick Norton and Nick Shailes as well as outstanding catcher Matt Norton.

The following year the majority of this team would compete at the Australian Under 19 Men's Nationals in Calbooture. With 10 of the 15 players only 16 years old the team overcame the huge age difference to secure their first of four consecutive National Titles at the under 19 level. This team also saw the inclusion of Michael Tanner, James Darby, Peter Albee, and Adam Thomas.

Associations 
The Australian Capital Territory is made up of 7 Associations; 
Central Canberra Softball Association
Jerrabomberra Softball Association
North Canberra Softball Association
South Tuggeranong Softball Association
Tuggeranong Softball and Recreation Association
Woden Valley Softball Association
And one Umpires Association;
Softball Umpires Association ACT.

See also 
Australian Softball Federation
ASF National Championships

References 
ACT, Softball. “History.” Softball ACT, https://www.act.softball.org.au/history/.

External links 
Softball Canberra
Australian Softball Federation
International Softball Federation

Softball governing bodies in Australia
1959 establishments in Australia
Sof